Andreevsky, Andreevski, Andreyevsky is a Russian, Bulgarian and Macedonian surname. Feminine: Andreevskaya, Andreyevskaya.

It may refer to:
Sergey Andreyevsky, Russian  writer, poet, literary critic and lawyer
Petre M. Andreevski, Macedonian poet

See also
Andreyevsky (rural locality), Russian rural localities

Russian-language surnames